Kokshetau is a city in Akmola Region, Kazakhstan, which may consist of :

 the City of Kokshetau
 the Kokshetau City Administration
 the Kokshetau Region, former administrative division in Kazakh Soviet Socialist Republic and later Kazakhstan

Kokshetau may also refer to:

 Kokshetau Hills, a mountain system of the Kazakh Uplands
 Kokshetau Lakes, a lake group in Akmola and Northern Kazakhstan regions
 Kokshetau Mountains, a small mountain range in Akmola Region, highest point Mount Kokshe
 Kokshetau National Park, a protected area in Akmola and Karaganda regions, Kazakhstan
 Kokshetau Airport, an airport in Akmola Region, Kazakhstan
 Kokshetau-1 station
 Kokshetau-2 station

Sports
 FC Kokshetau, former name of a football club from Kokshetau, Kazakhstan.